Gaby Spartz (née Montero) (born September 1, 1987) is an Ecuadorian Twitch streamer and YouTube gamer. She is also the founder of the market research company Dose.

Career

In 2009, Spartz launched Spartz Media (now Dose), a company that crowdsourced content from its users, across dozens of websites. GivesMeHope, one of the web properties, asked readers to share their answer to the question “What gives you hope?” in short anonymous stories. The website was created as a response to FMyLife, and went on to become a published book.

In 2015, the company changed its name to Dose, launched Dose.com and raised $25 million in venture financing.

Spartz started streaming on Twitch in 2015, while working at Dose. She became a Twitch partner in April 2015, and that summer, she left Dose to focus on full-time streaming and doing commentary at high-level Magic: The Gathering events. As a contractor for Wizards of the Coast, she writes articles for their website, DailyMTG.com. She's been involved in tournament reporting, the worldwide release of Magic: The Gathering Arena and special game modes in Arena, such as “Gaby’s Greedy Draft”.

Recognition
Spartz was named to INC's 30 under 30 class of 2013.  Built in Chicago listed her as a female founder who has raised over $1M. Spartz was named one of the "Best Female Streamers To Watch" by Tech Junkie, and a Twitch Ambassador for Twitchcon 2019.

Personal life

Spartz was born and raised in Quito, Ecuador. She is the younger of two sisters. She went to school at the University of Notre Dame. She now lives in Denver, Colorado.

Spartz married Emerson Spartz, her college boyfriend, in 2011. They divorced in 2017.

On October 11, 2021, Spartz and her boyfriend Luis Scott-Vargas's first child was born, a boy named Santi.

References 

1987 births
Living people
Ecuadorian YouTubers
Ecuadorian businesspeople
21st-century businesspeople
21st-century businesswomen
Twitch (service) streamers
People from Quito
Ecuadorian expatriates in the United States
University of Notre Dame alumni